Neochori is a community in the municipality of Xanthi in the Xanthi regional unit of Greece. It consists of the settlements of Neochori, Ioniko, Kalyva, Kato Ioniko, Sidiropetra and Stavrochori. 

Populated places in Xanthi (regional unit)